Winter Songs (in Australia and New Zealand titled Stay) is the sixth studio album released by Irish singer/songwriter and Boyzone frontman Ronan Keating. It was released by Polydor Records on 16 November 2009 in the UK and Ireland, debuting at number 16 and 12 in each respective album chart. The first single, a cover of Grammy Award-winning American country music duo Sugarland's hit "Stay", was released digitally on the same day.

Album information
The album Winter Songs follows the UK number one album Songs for My Mother released six months earlier, this time pulling together a set of 11 songs that evoke special memories of winter and Christmas for Ronan Keating. Winter Songs includes traditional Christmas classics such as "Silent Night" and "Have Yourself a Merry Little Christmas" as well as modern festive classics like Joni Mitchell's River and Sugarland's "Stay". Songs originally performed by artists like Simon & Garfunkel ("Homeward Bound") and Bob Dylan ("Ring Them Bells") are also included on the album, which also includes two brand new Ronan Keating songs "It's Only Christmas" and "Scars". Like Keating's previous album, Winter Songs is produced by Stephen Lipson (Paul McCartney, Annie Lennox and Pet Shop Boys). The album also features the last studio recording of Stephen Gately, who died a short while after the album was completed. Ronan told The News of the World: "What keeps me going is that Stephen is on this album. His vocal on Little Drummer Boy is one of the most beautiful recordings. He is almost angelic – which is truly fitting as I believe my friend is an angel now." In a press release about the album, Keating said that "some of these songs conjure up some of my favorite Christmas memories".

Track listing
Credits from booklet.
 "Winter Song" (Sara Bareilles/Ingrid Michaelson)
 "Stay" (Jennifer Nettles)
 "Scars" (Steve McEwan/John White)
 "Homeward Bound" (Paul Simon)
 "River" (Joni Mitchell)
 "It's Only Christmas" (Ronan Keating/Paul Barry)
 "Little Drummer Boy" (Guest vocals by Stephen Gately) (Katherine Davis/Henry Onorati/Harry Simeone)
 "Ring Them Bells" (Bob Dylan)
 "Caledonia" (Dougie MacLean)
 "Silent Night" (Franz Gruber)
 "Have Yourself a Merry Little Christmas" (Ralph Blane/Hugh Martin)
 "I Won't Last a Day Without You" (Paul Williams/Roger Nichols)

Australian alternative track
 6. "It's Only Christmas" (Duet with Kate Ceberano) (Ronan Keating/Paul Barry)

Notes

Chart

References

External links
 

Ronan Keating albums
2009 Christmas albums
Albums produced by Stephen Lipson
Pop Christmas albums